The 2001 Tour de Corse (formally the 45th Tour de Corse - Rallye de France) was the twelfth round of the 2001 World Rally Championship. The race was held over three days between 19 October and 21 October 2001, and was won by Citroën's Jesús Puras, his 1st win in the World Rally Championship.

Background

Entry list

Itinerary
All dates and times are CEST (UTC+2).

Results

Overall

World Rally Cars

Classification

Special stages

Championship standings

FIA Cup for Production Rally Drivers

Classification

Special stages

Championship standings
Bold text indicates 2001 World Champions.

FIA Cup for Super 1600 Drivers

Classification

Special stages

Championship standings
Bold text indicates 2001 World Champions.

References

External links 
 Official website of the World Rally Championship

Tour de Corse
Tour de Corse
Tour de Corse